"Stuck in My Heart" is the debut single by the Danish boy band C21, released in 2002 on the EMI label. It was the lead single as well as the opening track from their debut studio album, C21 (2003). It is a pop song that was written by Claus Hasfeldt and Lars Nielsen.

Track listing

Charts

References

External links
 
 
 
 

2002 debut singles
2002 songs
C21 (band) songs
EMI Records singles